The 1979 Women's Junior World Handball Championship was the 2nd edition of the tournament and took place in Yugoslavia from 13 to 23 October.

The title was won by the Soviet Union who finished on top after winning four of their five games with East Germany finishing in second place.

Group stage

Group A

Group B

Group C

Final round

Group 7-12

Group 1-6

Ranking
The final rankings from the 1979 edition:

References

External links 

Women's Junior World Handball
Women's Junior World Handball Championship, 1979
1979
Junior Handball
Handball in Yugoslavia